Sean Clancy (born 30 December 1988) is an Irish Muay thai kickboxer and the reigning WBC Muaythai Super Lightweight World Champion.

He is the former WBC Muaythai Super Lightweight International champion, the former Cage Muaythai Super Lightweight champion and ISKA Irish Welterweight champion. He was the 2019 WBC Muaythai "Male Fighter of the Year".

He is currently signed with ONE Championship and will compete in their Bantamweight Muaythai division.

Muay Thai career
Fighting in the renowned Lumpini Stadium, Clancy took on Matt Sheady. He won the fight by a second round TKO, after a series of knees and elbows.

During Cage Kings' inaugural event, Clancy fought against his fellow Irish Nak Muay Paul Budden. Clancy won the fight by a unanimous decision.

Clancy stepped in as a late notice replacement to face the multi divisional Lumpini Stadium champion Saenchai during THAI FIGHT Samui 2016. Clancy lost in the third round, by TKO.

Clancy fought for the Caged Muaythai Super Lightweight tile against Matthew Bune during CMT 10. Cage Muaythai differed from the usual muaythai fights in that the competitors fought in the 4 oz gloves, typically used in mixed martial arts, instead of the larger boxing gloves. Clancy won the fight by a fourth round TKO.

In 2018 Clancy participated in the K-1 Super Lightweight Tournament, being scheduled to face Jun Nakazawa in the tournament quarter finals. Clancy lost the quarter final bout, losing by TKO in the very first round of the fight.

Sean Clancy fought against Roy Willis for the International Super Lightweight WBC Muaythai title during Lion Fight 52. Clancy won the fight by split decision, with two judges scoring in his favor (48-47, 49-48) and one judge scoring the fight for Willis (50-45).

Following his capture of the WBC Muaythai International title, Clancy was given an opportunity to fight for the World Super Lightweight title as well. He was scheduled to face Alessandro Sara at the Neptune Stadium in Cork. Clancy won the fight through a unanimous decision.

He afterwards fought during Lion Fight 60 against Ramesh Habib for the Lion Fight World Super Lightweight title. He was unable to mount a comeback after being dropped in the first round, and lost a unanimous decision.

Clancy's first fight in ONE Championship was against Pongsiri P.K.Saenchaimuaythaigym, during ONE Championship: A New Breed 2. Clancy lost a unanimous decision.

Clancy faced Tawanchai P.K. Saenchaimuaythaigym at ONE Championship: Dangal on 15 May 2021. He lost the bout via head kick knockout at the beginning of the third round.

Championships and accomplishments
International Sport Karate Association
ISKA Irish Welterweight Muay Thai Championship
Two successful title defenses
Cage Kings
CK World Super Lightweight Championship
Caged Muay Thai
CMT World Super Lightweight Championship
World Boxing Council Muaythai
WBC Muaythai International Super Lightweight Championship
WBC Muaythai World Super Lightweight Championship
2019 Male Fighter of the Year

Muay thai record

|-  style="background:#fbb"
| 2021-5-15|| Loss || align=left| Tawanchai P.K. Saenchaimuaythaigym || ONE Championship: Dangal || Kallang, Singapore || KO (Head Kick) || 3 || 0:35
|-  style="background:#fbb"
| 2020-9-11|| Loss || align=left| Pongsiri P.K.Saenchaimuaythaigym || ONE Championship: A New Breed 2 || Bangkok, Thailand || Decision (Unanimous)  || 3 || 3:00
|-  bgcolor="#fbb"
| 2019-9-21|| Loss ||align=left| Ramesh Habib || Lion Fight 60 || Las Vegas, Nevada, United States || Decision (Unanimous) || 5 || 3:00
|-
! style=background:white colspan=9 |
|-  bgcolor="#cfc"
| 2019-7-20||Win ||align=left| Alessandro Sara || Siam Warriors Superfights || Cork, Ireland || Decision (Unanimous) || 5 || 3:00
|-
! style=background:white colspan=9 |
|-  bgcolor="#cfc"
| 2019-3-16||Win ||align=left| Roy Willis || Lion Fight 52 || Dublin, Ireland || Decision (Split) || 5 || 3:00
|-
! style=background:white colspan=9 |
|-  bgcolor="#fbb"
| 2018-11-3||Loss ||align=left| Jun Nakazawa || K-1 World GP 2018: 3rd Super Lightweight, Quarter Finals || Saitama, Japan || TKO (Punches) || 1 || 1:09
|-  bgcolor="#cfc"
| 2018-10-13|| Win ||align=left| Chris Mauceri || Lion Fight 48 || Cork, Ireland || Decision (Unanimous) || 3 || 3:00
|-  bgcolor="#fbb"
| 2017-11-24||Loss||align=left| Charlie Peters || KGP || Baghdad, Iraq || TKO || 1 ||
|-  bgcolor="#c5d2ea"
| 2017-10-10|| Draw ||align=left| Dommie Kelly || Siam Warriors: Fight Night || Cork, Ireland || Decision (Unanimous) || 5 || 3:00
|-
! style=background:white colspan=9 |
|-  bgcolor="#cfc"
| 2017-9-7||Win ||align=left| Padsaenlek Rachanon || Samui Fight 2017 || Ko Samui, Thailand || Decision (Unanimous) || 5 || 3:00
|-  bgcolor="#cfc"
| 2017-8-4|| Win ||align=left| Matthew Bune || Caged Muaythai 10 || Crestmead, Queensland || TKO || 4 || 
|-
! style=background:white colspan=9 |
|-  bgcolor="#fbb"
| 2017-4-29||Loss||align=left| Kongsak P.K. Saenchai Muaythaigym || THAI FIGHT Samui 2017 || Ko Samui, Thailand || KO (Left Hook) || 1 ||
|-  bgcolor="#cfc"
| 2017-3-5|| Win ||align=left| Looktum Hollywoodpattaya || Max Muaythai || Pattaya, Thailand || Decision || 5 || 3:00
|-
|-  bgcolor="#cfc"
| 2016-6-4|| Win ||align=left| Robert NG || Siam Warriors Muaythai Show || Cork, Ireland || Decision (Unanimous) || 5 || 3:00
|-
! style=background:white colspan=9 |
|-  bgcolor="#fbb"
| 2016-4-30||Loss||align=left| Saenchai || THAI FIGHT Samui 2016 || Ko Samui, Thailand || TKO || 3 ||
|-  bgcolor="#cfc"
| 2015-12-5|| Win ||align=left| Matthew Bune || Caged Muaythai 7 || Crestmead, Queensland || Decision (Unanimous) || 3 || 3:00
|-  bgcolor="#cfc"
| 2014-11-11||Win ||align=left| Paul Budden || Cage Kings 1 || Cork, Ireland || Decision (Unanimous) || 3 || 3:00
|-
! style=background:white colspan=9 |
|-  bgcolor="#cfc"
| 2014-2-2 ||Win ||align=left| Matt Sheedy || Lumpini Stadium || Bangkok, Thailand || TKO (Knees and elbows) || 2 || 
|-
|-  bgcolor="#cfc"
| 2013-10-12 ||Win||align=left| Andy Grey || Judgement Day || Cork, Ireland || Decision || 5 || 3:00
|-
|-  bgcolor="#fbb"
| 2013-4-13 ||Loss||align=left| Angelo Campoli || Last Man Standing, Tournament Semifinals|| Birmingham, United Kingdom || TKO (Doctor stoppage) || 1 || 
|-
|-  bgcolor="#cfc"
| 2013-4-13 ||Win||align=left| Matt McKoown || Last Man Standing, Tournament Quarterfinals || Birmingham, United Kingdom || Decision || 5 || 3:00
|-
| colspan=9 | Legend:

See also
 List of male kickboxers

References 

1988 births
Living people
Sportspeople from Cork (city)
Irish male kickboxers
Irish Muay Thai practitioners
ONE Championship kickboxers